The Fédération Internationale Féline (FIFé) (in English "International Feline Federation") is a federation of cat registries. There are currently forty-two member organizations in forty countries. Membership spans Europe, South America, and Asia. FIFé is one of the nine members of the World Cat Congress.

History
Founded by Marguerite Ravel, the federation was unofficially started in 1949 in Paris, France, at a meeting between the Fédération Féline Française (French Cat Federation), the Royal Cat Society of Flanders and the Società Felina Italiana (Italian Cat Society). At the organisation's first general assembly, in Ghent, Belgium, the federation was officially founded. For the occasion, all participants received a cat shaped statuette, in pink sandstone, that Marguerite Ravel had commissioned from the sculptor Jean Martel.

In 1972 the Brazilian Cat Club joined, making it necessary to change the Euro-centric name of the federation. The "d'Europe" was dropped, and the abbreviation was changed to FIFé.

Organisation
FIFé is organized into national sub-federations (e.g. Felis Britannica in the United Kingdom) which handle pedigree registrations, cat shows and awards in each country. FIFé's Executive Board and General Assembly are supported by five commissions: 
Judges & Standard Commission
Breeding & Registration Commission
Show Commission
Health & Welfare Commission
Disciplinary Commission

Members 
 Asociación Felina Argentina  (1988)
 Klub der Katzenfreunde  (1950)
 Österreichischer Verband für die Zucht und Haltung von Edelkatzen, (1979)
 Felis Belgica vzw,  (1949)
 National Federation of Felinology (2006)
 Federação Felina Brasileira   (1972)
 Felinolog  (1994)
 Fédération Féline Helvétique (1949)
 China Cat Union (2018)
 Asociación Club Felino Colombiano (2009)
 Český svaz chovatelů – Sdružení chovatelů koček (1968)
 1. Deutscher Edelkatzenzüchter Verband e.V. (1951)
 Landsforeningen Felis Danica (1950)
 Eesti Kassikasvatajate Liit  (1994)
 Asociación Felina Española  (1978)
 Suomen Kissaliitto r.y. (1961)
 Fédération Féline Française  (1949)
 Felis Britannica (2005)
 Feline Federation of Greece (1999)
 Savez Felinoloških Društava Hrvatske (1994)
 Felis Hungarica - Magyar Macskások Egyesülete  (2008)
 Indonesian Cat Association  (2007)
 Kynjakettir Kattaræktarfélag Íslands (1995)
 Associazione Nazionale Felina Italiana (1949)
 Verein der Katzenzüchter Liechtensteins (1981)
 Lithuanian Felinology Association (1994)
 Cat Fanciers Clubs Association (1995)
 LUX-CAT-CLUB Fédération Féline Luxembourgeoise  (1983)
 Association Feline Felis Moldova (2015)
 Federacion Felina de México A.C.  (1982)
 Kelab Kucing Malaysia (1985)
 Felikat (1949)
 Vereniging Mundikat (1979)
 Norske Rasekattklubbers Riksforbund (1951)
 Polska Federacja Felinologiczna - Felis Polonia (2007)
 Clube Português de Felinicultura (1987)
 "Felis Romania" (2007)
 Felis Russica (1989)
 Zveza Felinoloških Društev Slovenije (1981)
 Federácia Felis Slovakia (1993)
 Ukrainian Felinology Union  (1998)

Recognized breeds 
FIFe currently recognizes 48 official breeds of cats for championship competitions. All breeds are divided into four categories and identified with a three-letter code, according to the EMS. The EMS is a system used by FIFé, and all its members, to easily identify cats by alphanumeric codes.

See also
List of cat breeds
List of cat registries
Fédération Cynologique Internationale for dogs

References

External links 

Cat registries
1949 establishments in France
Organizations based in Paris
Organizations established in 1949